Odell Shepard (July 22, 1884 in Sterling, Illinois – July 19, 1967 in New London, Connecticut) was an American professor, poet, and politician who was the 86th Lieutenant Governor of Connecticut from 1941 to 1943. He won a Pulitzer Prize in 1938.

Life 
Shepard was born in Illinois. He graduated from Harvard University, and taught at the English department of Yale University. A professor of English at Trinity College in 1917–1946, he was a mentor to Abbie Huston Evans.  He edited the works of Henry David Thoreau, Louisa May Alcott, and Henry Wadsworth Longfellow.

Shepard wrote a biography of Bronson Alcott, the father of writer Louisa May Alcott and one of the foremost Transcendentalists: Pedlar's Progress: The Life of Bronson Alcott, published by Little, Brown in 1937, for which he won the 1938 Pulitzer Prize for Biography or Autobiography.

His papers are held at Trinity College.

He died in 1967.

Awards 
 1938 Pulitzer Prize for his Pedlar's Progress: The Life of Bronson Alcott, (Little, Brown and Company)
 Golden Rose Award

Works 

 
 
 
  reprint 2008
  reprint 1969
  reissue 1984

Biography 
  reprint 2007

Coauthor 
  Willard Shepard was the son of Odell Shepard.
  Historical fiction.

Edited

References

External links 
 
 
 
 

1884 births
1967 deaths
20th-century American poets
20th-century American biographers
Lieutenant Governors of Connecticut
Pulitzer Prize for Biography or Autobiography winners
Harvard University alumni
Yale University faculty
Trinity College (Connecticut) faculty
20th-century American politicians
People from Sterling, Illinois
20th-century American non-fiction writers